Eco-anxiety (short for ecological anxiety and also known as eco-distress or climate-anxiety) has been defined as "a chronic fear of environmental doom". Extensive studies had been done on ecological anxiety since 2007, and various definitions remain in use. Another widely cited definition is: "the generalized sense that the ecological foundations of existence are in the process of collapse." Some scholars use the term "eco-anxiety" as a synonym for "climate-anxiety", while others like to treat the terms separately. While much ecological disruption results from climate change, some is caused by direct human activity, such as deforestation. The condition is not a medical diagnosis and is regarded as a rational response to the reality of climate change; however, severe instances can have a mental health impact if left without alleviation.

Eco-anxiety is an unpleasant emotion, though it can also motivate useful behavior such as the gathering of relevant information. However, it can also manifest as conflict avoidance, or even be "paralyzing." Some people have reported experiencing so much anxiety and fear about the future with climate change that they choose not to have children. Eco-anxiety received more attention after 2017, and especially since late 2018 with Greta Thunberg having publicly discussed her own eco-anxiety.

In 2018, the American Psychological Association issued a report about the impact of climate change on mental health. It said that "gradual, long-term changes in climate can also surface a number of different emotions, including fear, anger, feelings of powerlessness, or exhaustion". Generally this is likely to have the greatest impact on young people. Eco-anxiety that is now affecting young adults has been likened to Cold War fears of nuclear annihilation felt by baby boomers. Research has found that although there are heightened emotional experiences linked with acknowledgement and anticipation of climate change and its impact on society, these are inherently adaptive. Furthermore, engaging with these emotional experiences leads to increased resilience, agency, reflective functioning and collective action. Individuals are encouraged to find collective ways of processing their climate related emotional experiences in order to support mental health and well being.

The American Psychology Association (APA) describes eco-anxiety as “the chronic fear of environmental cataclysm that comes from observing the seemingly irrevocable impact of climate change and the associated concern for one's future and that of next generations”. The APA, therefore, considers that the internalization of the great environmental problems that affect our planet can have psychological consequences of varying seriousness in some people.

Prevalence 

2018 surveys conducted in the United States found between 21% and 29% of Americans said they were "very" worried about the climate, double the rate of a similar study in 2015. The condition has become especially common among children and young people – in some universities over 70% of students have self described as suffering from eco-anxiety, though as of early 2021, validated ways to assess the prevalence of climate or eco-anxiety were not well established. A survey published in September 2021 had queried 10,000 young people from 10 countries across the world, finding that almost 60% were either very or extremely worried about climate change. Two thirds said they felt sad, afraid and anxious, while close to 40% reported they were hesitant to have children. An October 2021 report based on polling in the UK found 78% of people surveyed expressed some degree of eco-anxiety. The report found no significant difference in levels of eco-anxiety based on age or social class. It did however find that women (45%) were substantially more likely to report high levels of eco-anxiety compared to men (36%). Similar observations have been reported worldwide, including European and African countries.

A 2022 study commissioned by the American Academy of Sleep Medicine reported that "anxieties around climate change and environmental issues" caused insomnia for 70% of Americans.

Although the notions of eco-anxiety and climate change anxiety have gained traction, one of the current hot topics in the scientific literature concerns their assessment.

This concept of climate or ecological anxiety and grief is far-reaching. This is due to the extensive awareness about climate change that is made possible through technological communications. Climate change is a severe, ongoing, and global threat that is largely characterized by uncertainty and lack of understanding. For this reason, anxiety and grief in humans is a natural and rational response for those feeling fear or a lack of control. For example, this could arise in people who are forced to leave their homes, deal with uncertainty about their future environment, or feel concern for the future harm of their children. Climate grief can be divided into three categories: physical ecological losses, the loss of environmental knowledge, and anticipated future losses. Those who rely most closely on the land and land-based activities for their livelihood and wellbeing, such as Indigenous people and farmers are especially vulnerable to mental health decline.

Related emotional responses 
Other climate specific psychological impacts are less well studied than eco-anxiety. They include eco-depression, eco-anger, and states of denial or numbness, which can be brought on by too much exposure to alarmist presentation of the climate threat. A study that separated the effects of eco-anxiety, eco-depression and eco-anger, found that eco-anger is the best for a person's wellbeing. This study also found that eco-anger is good for motivating participation in actions that combat climate change. A separate report from 2021 found that eco-anger was significantly more common among young people.

Treatment and response 
The first step for therapists in treating eco-anxiety is realizing that a fearful response to a real condition is not pathological. Eco-fear is a completely normal response even if the client finds it profoundly disturbing. Therapists need to take clients' fears about the situation seriously and "not assume they're a dysfunctional mental health problem or that a person suffering from eco-anxiety is somehow ill." However, fear and anxiety about global warming may exacerbate pre-existing mental health conditions. Symptoms include irritability, sleeplessness, loss of appetite, bouts of weakness, panic attacks, and twitching. In terms of treatment, individualistic models of mental health are "not designed to deal with collective trauma on a planetary scale".

Various non-clinical treatments, group work options, internet based support forums, and self-help books are available for people suffering from less severe psychological conditions. Some of the psychological impacts require no form of treatment at all, and can even be positive: for example, worry about climate change can be positively related to information-seeking and to a sense of being able to influence such problems.

One way to combat eco-anxiety is through  beliefs about the effectiveness of personal actions. Eco-anxiety can be fueled in part by climate change helplessness, a form of learned helplessness applied to climate change fears. Because climate change is such an enormous issue with such dire consequences, an individual's actions may seem to make no difference in combatting the bigger issue. This can demotivate people from taking any pro-environmental at all.  But, an intervention advocating for the effectiveness of individual actions can reduce feelings of apathy and anxiety associated with climate change helplessness. When people receive information describing how their personal actions impact the environment, they report less fear of climate change, and intend to make more sustainable choices, showing that climate change helplessness can be treated by beliefs in climate change efficacy.

In general, psychotherapists say that when individuals take action to combat climate change, this reduces anxiety levels by bringing a sense of personal empowerment and feelings of connection with others in the community. Many psychologists emphasize that in addition to action, there is a need to build emotional resilience to avoid burnout.

A 2021 literature review found that emotional responses to crisis can be adaptive when the individual has the capacity and support to process and reflect on this emotion. In these cases, individuals are able to grow from their experiences and support others. In the context of climate change, this capacity for deep reflection is necessary to navigate the emotional challenges that both individuals and societies face.

Organisations 
Several psychological organizations have been founded around climate psychology. Scholars have pointed out that there is a need for a systemic approach to provide various resources for people in relation to the mental health impacts of ecological problems and climate change. Some organizations, such as the Royal College of Psychiatrists, provide web based guidance to help caregivers assist children and young adults deal with their eco-anxiety.

See also 
Effects of climate change on mental health

References

External links 
 How to transform apocalypse fatigue into action on global warming  (2017), TED Talk by Per Espen Stoknes on overcoming defensive psychological impacts
 How to shift your mindset and chose your future (2020), TED Talk on 'stubborn optimism' by Tom Rivett-Carnac

Environmental psychology
Climate change and society
Fear